Iduna is a genus of tree warbler in the family Acrocephalidae. Keyserling and Blasius gave no explanation of the genus name Iduna. It is sometimes lumped in the genus Hippolais, although in 2009 it was found to belong to the Iduna clade.

It contains the following species:
 African yellow warbler (Iduna natalensis)
 Mountain yellow warbler (Iduna similis)
 Booted warbler (Iduna caligata)
 Sykes's warbler (Iduna rama)
 Eastern olivaceous warbler (Iduna pallida)
 Western olivaceous warbler (Iduna opaca)

References

 
Acrocephalidae
Taxa named by Alexander von Keyserling
Taxa named by Johann Heinrich Blasius